Hugo Blümner (9 August 1844, in Berlin – 1 January 1919, in Zürich) was a German classical archaeologist and philologist.

Biography
Blümner studied with Otto Jahn in Bonn and wrote his doctoral thesis 1866 in Berlin on Lucian. He taught in the universities of Breslau and Königsberg, and after 1877 was professor in the University of Zürich. He is author and editor of many philological and archaeological works, of which the most important are: Die gewerbliche Thätigkeit der Völker des klassischen Altertums (The commercial activities of the peoples of classical history; 1869), Technologie und Terminologie der Gewerbe und Künste bei Griechen und Römern (Technology and terminology of trade and the arts in Greece and Rome; 4 vols., 1874–88), Leben und Sitten der Griechen (Life and customs of the Greeks; 1887), Der Maximaltarif des Diokletian, with Theodor Mommsen (1893) and Pausaniæ Græciæ Descriptio (1896).  He revised Hermann's Griechische Privataltertümer (1881) as well.

Among Blümner's doctoral students was the literary scholar and Germanist Emil Ermatinger.

References

External links

1844 births
1919 deaths
German philologists
Archaeologists from Berlin
Academic staff of the University of Zurich
Academic staff of the University of Breslau
Academic staff of the University of Königsberg
People from the Province of Brandenburg
German male writers